Nestroyplatz  is a station on  of the Vienna U-Bahn. It is located at Nestroyplatz Square, in the Leopoldstadt District. It opened in 1979.

References

External links 
 

Buildings and structures in Leopoldstadt
Railway stations opened in 1979
Vienna U-Bahn stations
1979 establishments in Austria
Railway stations in Austria opened in the 20th century